Vicetone is a Dutch electronic music DJ and production duo formed by Ruben den Boer ((), born 22 January 1992) and Victor Pool (born 9 July 1992) from Groningen. The duo began as a DJ act, and in 2013, they were voted into the DJ Mag Top 100 DJs list for the first time at 60th as a new entry. Later in 2014, they went up 24 places on the list, coming 36th. In 2015, they fell 14 places to 50th. They made a return to the Top 100, coming in at 83rd in 2019 but dropped out the subsequent year.

Career
In 2015, Vicetone released two singles with Kat Nestel titled "Angels" and "Nothing Stopping Me," both on Ultra Music, released a remix for a song from the popular game League of Legends called "Project Yi" and they remixed Hardwell and Tiesto's collaboration, "Colors".

To start off 2016, Vicetone released a new track on Spinnin' Records called "Pitch Black". This was followed by the release of their first EP entitled Aurora, which was released in April before the beginning of a headline tour of the same name. In June 2016, they released the song 'Nevada' to Monstercat in collaboration with Cozi Zuehlsdorff.

In 2018, Vicetone released another single with Cozi Zuehlsdorff titled "Way Back".

In 2020, Vicetone rose to international stardom over the rise of their 2014 remix of Tony Igy's song "Astronomia" as an internet meme, in which the remix plays over a group of Ghanaian men dancing while carrying a coffin, a common funeral tradition in Ghana and parts of Africa with the idea of sending off deceased loved ones in style, rather than in the usual manner of mourning.

On 22 January 2021, Vicetone announced that their debut album titled "Legacy" would be releasing on 2 April of that same year. This announcement came alongside the release of its lead single, "No Rest".

Discography

Albums

Extended plays

Singles

Production credits

Remixes

Charted
 Tony Igy - Astronomia (Vicetone Remix) (2014)

2012
 Calvin Harris featuring Ne-Yo – Let's Go (Vicetone Remix)
 Flo Rida – Whistle (Vicetone Remix)
 Adele – Someone Like You (Vicetone Remix)
 Maroon 5 – Payphone (Vicetone Remix)
 Nicky Romero and Fedde le Grand featuring Matthew Koma – Sparks (Vicetone Remix)
 Morgan Page – The Longest Road (Vicetone Remix)
 Youngblood Hawke – We Come Running (Vicetone Remix)
 Zedd – Clarity (Vicetone Remix)

2013

 Hook N Sling vs Nervo – Reason (Vicetone Remix)
 Doctor P. featuring Eva Simons – Bulletproof (Vicetone Remix)
 Cazzette – Weapon (Vicetone Remix)
 David Puentez featuring Shena – The One (Vicetone remix)
 Matthew Koma – One Night (Vicetone Remix)
 Nervo – Hold On (Vicetone Remix)
 Nicky Romero vs. Krewella – Legacy (Vicetone Remix)
 Linkin Park and Steve Aoki - A Light That Never Comes (Vicetone Remix)

2014

 Krewella - Enjoy The Ride (Vicetone Remix)
 Cash Cash - Overtime (Vicetone Remix)
 Dillon Francis, The Chain Gang of 1974, Sultan & Shepard - When We Were Young (Vicetone Remix)

2015

 Urban Cone featuring Tove Lo - Come Back To Me (Vicetone Remix)
 Little Boots - No Pressure (Vicetone Remix)
 Hardwell and Tiësto featuring Andreas Moe - Colors (Vicetone Remix)
 Kelly Clarkson - Invincible (Vicetone Remix)

2016

 Project: Yi (Vicetone Remix) (from League of Legends)
 Vicetone x Bob Marley - Is This Love [Free]
 Bonnie McKee and Vicetone - I Want It All (Remix)
 The Weeknd featuring Daft Punk - Starboy (Vicetone Remix)

2017

 A R I Z O N A - Oceans Away (Vicetone Remix)
 Dua Lipa - New Rules (Vicetone Remix)

2018

 The Prodigy - Omen (Vicetone Remix)
 The Knocks  featuring Foster The People - Ride Or Die (Vicetone Remix)

2020

 Alesso featuring Liam Payne - "Midnight" (Vicetone Remix)

References

External links
 

Dutch DJs
DJ duos
2012 establishments in the Netherlands
Musical groups established in 2012
Musical groups from Groningen (city)
Progressive house musicians
Future house musicians
Dutch house music groups
Dutch electronic music groups
Monstercat artists
Electronic dance music duos